Artemisia nesiotica is a rare California species of sagebrush in the daisy family, known by the common name island sagebrush. It is endemic to the Channel Islands of California, found on 3 of the 8 islands (San Nicolas, San Clemente, and Santa Barbara Islands).

Description
Artemisia nesiotica is a small shrub growing up to about 50 cm (20 inches) tall and generally rounded in shape. It produces several thin, upright stems from a woody base. The foliage is made up of woolly leaves divided into many thin, flat, threadlike segments. The inflorescence is a narrow cluster of several flower heads. The fruit is a tiny resinous achene with a pappus of hairs.

Etymology
The earliest name given to the plaint was Crossostephium insulare, coined by Per Axel Rydberg in 1916. In 1935, Philip Alexander Munz declared this to be a variety of Artemisia californica. Peter Raven later wanted to recognize the Channel Island plants as a distinct species within Artemisia, but the name Artemisia insularis had already been used for a Kuril Islands plant in 1936. Hence Raven's new name, Artemisia nesiotica.

References

External links
Calflora Database: Artemisia nesiotica (Island sagebrush)
Jepson Manual eFlora (TJM2) treatment of Artemisia nesiotica

nesiotica
Endemic flora of California
Natural history of the Channel Islands of California
Natural history of the California chaparral and woodlands
Plants described in 1916